Hot Country Songs is a chart that ranks the top-performing country music songs in the United States, published by Billboard magazine.  In 1967, 23 different singles topped the chart, which was published at the time under the title Hot Country Singles, in 52 issues of the magazine.  Chart placings were based on playlists submitted by country music radio stations and sales reports submitted by stores.

In the issue of Billboard dated January 7, the number one position was held by Jack Greene with "There Goes My Everything", the song's third week at number one.  It remained at the top of the chart for the first five weeks of 1967 before it was replaced by Loretta Lynn's "Don't Come Home A' Drinkin' (With Lovin' On Your Mind)" in the issue dated February 11.  The song marked the first appearance at number one for Lynn, whose career would ultimately span six decades and lead to her being regarded as one of the most influential artists in country music history.  Another female vocalist who would go on to achieve a string of number one hits and be viewed as an all-time great of country music, Tammy Wynette, also reached number one for the first time in 1967.  Wynette topped the chart for the first time when she collaborated with David Houston on the song "My Elusive Dreams", and returned to the top spot later in the year with the solo single "I Don't Wanna Play House".  As a result of their lengthy and successful careers, both Lynn and Wynette would be dubbed the "first lady of country".

Three other artists reached number one for the first time in 1967, beginning with Wynn Stewart, who topped the chart for two weeks in June with "It's Such a Pretty World Today".  Leon Ashley achieved his only number one when he spent a single week in the top spot in September with "Laura (What's He Got That I Ain't Got)"; his success was unusual in that his single was released on his own label, which he had set up to record, release and distribute his material after failing to find success elsewhere. Finally, Jan Howard ended the year at number one with her first chart-topper, "For Loving You", a duet with Bill Anderson.  Sonny James spent the highest number of total weeks at number one in 1967, occupying the top spot for a total of eleven weeks with "Need You", "I'll Never Find Another You" and "It's the Little Things", one week more than Jack Greene spent at number one with "There Goes my Everything" and "All the Time".  James was one of three artists who each took three different singles to number one in 1967.  Buck Owens reached the top spot with "Where Does the Good Times Go", "Sam's Place" and "Your Tender Loving Care", which spent a combined total of eight weeks at number one.  David Houston spent a total of five weeks in the peak position with "With One Exception", "You Mean the World to Me" and his duet with Tammy Wynette.

Chart history

See also
1967 in music
1967 in country music
List of artists who reached number one on the U.S. country chart

References

1967
Country
Country
1967 record charts